Diamond Island is an island in the Ohio River ten miles west of Henderson in Henderson County, Kentucky, United States. It has an area of about half a square mile.

History

River piracy
In the late eighteenth century, it was a hideout for river pirates, most notably Samuel Mason and his gang in 1797 and the serial killers, the Harpe Brothers.

Diamond Island Massacre
In 1803, the Barnard family was emigrating from Virginia when one son, James, shot a deer on the bank. The family landed the boat to retrieve the deer and were ambushed by ten Native Americans, who were hiding in the canebrake. The first to board the boat was killed by Mrs. Barnard with an axe. Mr. Barnard shot and killed two before he was killed. The son, James, ran away with a corn knife, pursued by two. When one fell behind, James turned to fight and the last pursuer fled.

When James returned to the boat, his mother and father lay dead, and his two younger brothers and one sister were missing. What became of the three children was never known.

References

Rothert, Otto A.  The Outlaws of Cave-In-Rock.  Cleveland, 1924; rpt. 1996 
Columbia-Lippincott Gazetteer (New York: Columbia University Press, 1952) p. 512

River islands of Kentucky
Islands of the Ohio River
Landforms of Henderson County, Kentucky